Noel Ryan (10 November 1935 – 30 August 2015) was an Australian rules footballer who played with Footscray in the Victorian Football League (VFL).

Notes

External links 		
		

		
		
2015 deaths
1935 births
Australian rules footballers from Victoria (Australia)		
Western Bulldogs players
Yarrawonga Football Club players